The 2000 Meistriliiga was the tenth season of the Meistriliiga, Estonia's premier football league. Levadia won their second title.

League table

Relegation play-off

Kuressaare were awarded the playoff after Tervis withdrew due to unavailability of players active for the Estonian U-18 team.

Results
Each team played every opponent four times, twice at home and twice on the road, for a total of 36 games.

First half of season

Second half of season

Top scorers

See also
 2000 in Estonian football

References

Meistriliiga seasons
1
Estonia
Estonia